Evan Low (born June 5, 1983) is an American politician currently serving in the California State Assembly. He is a Democrat representing the 26th Assembly District, which encompasses parts of the Northern CA South Bay and Silicon Valley, including Cupertino, Sunnyvale, Santa Clara and portions of northern and western San Jose. He is a member of the California Legislative LGBT Caucus (and served as chair from 2017 to 2018 and 2021 to 2022), and currently serves as Chair of the California Asian American & Pacific Islander Legislative Caucus.

Prior to his election in the Assembly in 2014, Low served as Mayor and City Councilmember in Campbell, California.

On January 15, 2020, Low was named national co-chair of the Andrew Yang for president campaign.

Early life
Low was born in San Jose, California on June 5, 1983, to Chinese American optometrist Arthur Low. Low grew up in San Jose, California and attended Leland High School. In 2003, Low moved to Campbell, California.

Education
Low earned an associate's degree from De Anza College, a community college in Cupertino, California, and a bachelor's degree in political science from San Jose State University.

Campbell City Council
In 2004, Low unsuccessfully ran for a seat on the City Council, but he ran again in 2006 and won in his second attempt. Low worked as a senior district representative for California's former 28th State Assembly district Assemblymember Paul Fong.

When his colleagues selected him to become Campbell mayor in 2009, Low became the youngest openly gay, Asian American Mayor in the nation.

In 2013, his colleagues on the Campbell City Council selected him to serve as Mayor for a second time. His term on the council expired in 2014.

California Assembly
In 2014, Assembly Speaker Toni Atkins appointed Low as Assistant Majority Whip. Low was kept in the same leadership role by Atkins's successor, Speaker Anthony Rendon, in 2016.

Low chaired the California Assembly Business and Professions Committee from March 2016 until November 2021, when he was removed without explanation by Speaker Anthony Rendon. Low was replaced by Marc Berman.

Low is a co-founder and co-chair of the California Legislative Tech Caucus. There are 24 members of the Tech Caucus.

In 2016, Low introduced AB 1887 that would ban all California state-funded travel to states that enacted laws to discriminate against individuals based upon sexual orientation, gender identity, and gender expression, that was supported by U.S. House of Representatives Minority Leader Nancy Pelosi.

In 2016, New York Magazine identified Low as a potential United States presidential candidate in 2024 along with nine other young Democrats who, like Obama, have unusual ambition.

In the 2017–2018 session, The Sacramento Bee identified Low as California's most prolific lawmaker, where he had the most bills signed by any member of the state legislature by Governor Jerry Brown. He has also been credited with driving the future of Uber and Lyft in the California State Legislature.

In 2019, Low introduced AB-57, which would allow candidates with birth names in character-based languages—such as Chinese, Japanese, and Korean—to use those names in voter requested translated ballots. Previously, candidates such as Fiona Ma have had transliterated versions names of their name (e.g. Fei O Na Ma) appear on translated ballots. The bill also required candidates without character based birth names to phonetically translate their names on translated ballots, unless they prove that they are known under a different name within the target community. AB-57 was signed into law by Governor Gavin Newsom in July 2019 and went into effect in 2020.

2014 California State Assembly

2016 California State Assembly

2018 California State Assembly

2020 California State Assembly

2022 California State Assembly

After redistricting added Campbell to Assemblymember Marc Berman's district, Low announced he would run in the new 26th district spanning Sunnyvale, Cupertino, and Santa Clara.

Honors
San Francisco Mayor Gavin Newsom issued a Proclamation naming June 5, 2006, “Evan Low Day” in the City and County of San Francisco.

Assemblymember Low has been named "Legislator of the Year" by the Internet Association, TechNet, The Computing Technology Industry Association, California Faculty Association, Cellular Telecommunications Industry Association, California District Attorneys Association and Faculty Association of California Community Colleges.

References

External links 

 
 Campaign website

1983 births
21st-century American politicians
American LGBT people of Asian descent
American mayors of Chinese descent
California politicians of Chinese descent
De Anza College alumni
Democratic Party members of the California State Assembly
Gay politicians
Leland High School (San Jose, California) alumni
LGBT mayors of places in the United States
LGBT state legislators in California
Living people
Mayors of places in California
People from Campbell, California
Politicians from San Jose, California
San Jose State University alumni